Judy May Chu (born July 7, 1953) is an American politician serving as the U.S. representative for . A member of the Democratic Party, she has held a seat in Congress since 2009, representing  until redistricting. Chu is the first Chinese American woman elected to Congress.

Chu was elected to the California Board of Equalization in 2007, representing the 4th district. She previously served on the Garvey Unified School District Board of Education, on the Monterey Park City Council (with three terms as mayor) and in the California State Assembly. Chu ran in the 32nd congressional district special election for the seat vacated by Hilda Solis after Solis was confirmed as President Obama's Secretary of Labor in 2009. She defeated Republican candidate Betty Tom Chu and Libertarian candidate Christopher Agrella in a runoff election on July 14, 2009. Chu was redistricted to the 27th district in 2012, but still reelected to a third term, defeating Republican challenger Jack Orswell.

Early life
Chu was born in 1953 in Los Angeles. Her father, Judson Chu, was a Chinese American World War II veteran born in California, and her mother, May, was a war bride originally from Jiangmen, Guangdong. Chu grew up in South Los Angeles, near 62nd Street and Normandie Avenue, until her early teen years, when the family moved to the Bay Area.

Education
In 1974, Chu earned a B.A. degree in mathematics from UCLA. In 1979, she earned a Ph.D. degree in psychology from the California School of Professional Psychology of Alliant International University's Los Angeles campus.

Career

Academic
Chu taught psychology in the Los Angeles Community College District for 20 years, including 13 years at East Los Angeles College.

Local politics

Chu's first elected position was as a board member for the Garvey School District in Rosemead, California in 1985.

In 1988, Chu was elected to the city council of Monterey Park, California. In 1989, she became mayor of Monterey Park and served until 1994. Chu was mayor for three terms.

Chu ran for the California State Assembly in 1994, but lost the Democratic primary to Diane Martinez; in 1998, she lost the primary to Gloria Romero.

Chu was elected to the State Assembly on May 15, 2001, following a special election after Romero was elected to the State Senate. She was elected to a full term in 2002 and reelected in 2004. The district includes Alhambra, El Monte, Duarte, Monterey Park, Rosemead, San Gabriel, San Marino, and South El Monte, within Los Angeles County.

Barred by term limits from running for a third term in 2006, Chu was elected to the State Board of Equalization from the 4th district, representing most of Los Angeles County.

U.S. House of Representatives

Elections

2009 special

Chu decided to run for the 2009 special election for the California's 32nd congressional district after U.S. Representative Hilda Solis was appointed to become President Barack Obama's United States Secretary of Labor. Chu led the field in the May 19 special election, but due to the crowded field (eight Democrats and four Republicans) she only got 32% of the vote, well short of the 50% needed to win outright. In the runoff election, she defeated Republican Betty Chu (her cousin-in-law and a Monterey Park City Councilwoman) 62%–33%.

2010

Chu was heavily favored due to the district's heavy Democrat tilt. With a Cook Partisan Voting Index of D+15, it is one of the safest Democratic districts in the nation. She was reelected to her first full term with 71% of the vote.

2012

In August 2011, Chu decided to run in the newly redrawn California's 27th congressional district. The district has the second highest percentage of Asian Americans in the state with 37%, behind the newly redrawn 17th CD which is 50% Asian. Registered Democrats make up 42% of the district. Obama won the district with 63% in the 2008 presidential election. Jerry Brown won with 55% in the 2010 gubernatorial election. Chu was reelected, defeating Republican Jack Orswell 64% to 36%.

2014

Chu was reelected over Orswell, 59.4% to 40.6%.

2016

Chu was reelected over Orswell, 67.4% to 32.6%.

2018

Chu won reelection over fellow Democrat Bryan Witt by a 79.2% to 20.8% margin, in one of a handful of districts in California that featured only Democrats on its midterm ballot.

2020

Chu won reelection to her seventh term over Republican Johnny J. Nalbandian by a 69.8% to 30.2% margin. Nalbandian never conceded the race, citing unproven voter fraud.

Tenure

In 2009, Chu voted to increase the debt ceiling to $12.394 trillion. In 2010, she voted to increase the debt ceiling to $14.294 trillion. In January 2011, she voted against a bill to reduce spending on non-security items to fiscal year 2008 levels. In 2011, Chu voted against the Budget Control Act of 2011, which incrementally raised the debt ceiling.

In 2010, she voted against measures proposed by the House to strip government funding to Planned Parenthood, and opposed restricting federal funding of abortions.

Chu opposed the "See Something, Say Something Act of 2011," which provides "immunity for reports of suspected terrorist activity or suspicious behavior and response." She said, "if a person contacts law enforcement about something based solely on someone's race, religion, ethnicity, or national origin, they would not receive immunity from civil lawsuits."

In June 2011, the House Ethics Committee began an investigation after receiving information suggesting that two of Chu's top aides had directed staffers to do campaign tasks during regular work hours. The investigation found that Chu had sent two emails to her staff on how to respond to aspects of the Ethics Committee's inquiry. The Committee found no evidence that Chu was aware of her staff's actions, it did find that the emails represented actions that interfered with the committee's investigation of the matter, and on December 11, 2014, it formally reprimanded Chu for interfering with its investigation of her office.

In 2012, a Chinese spy, Christine "Fang Fang" Fang, volunteered for Chu's campaign and is suspected to have used political connections to spy for the Chinese Communist Party. Chu was one of several Democratic politicians who were targeted.

In 2015, The Intercept published an investigative work by Ali Gharib and Eli Clifton, assisted in part by the work of independent researcher Joanne Stocker, indicating that Chu received $11,150 from the People's Mujahedin of Iran (MEK) between January 2009 and September 2012, when the MEK was listed a Foreign Terrorist Organization. She is an advocate of the MEK.

On December 6, 2017, Chu was arrested during a protest outside of the U.S. Capitol.

In 2019, Chu was named "honorary chairwoman" of the Forums for Peaceful Reunification of China, an organization opposed to Taiwanese independence.

Chu accused Turkey, a NATO member, of inciting the conflict between Armenia and Azerbaijan over the disputed region of Nagorno-Karabakh. On October 1, 2020, she co-signed a letter to Secretary of State Mike Pompeo that condemned Azerbaijan's offensive operations against the Armenian-populated enclave of Nagorno-Karabakh, denounced Turkey's role in the Nagorno-Karabakh conflict and called for an immediate ceasefire.

As of October 2022, Chu had voted in line with Joe Biden's stated position 100% of the time.

Committee assignments

Committee on Ways and Means
Subcommittee on Health
Subcommittee on Human Resources
Committee on Small Business
Subcommittee on Economic Growth, Tax and Capital Access

Caucus memberships
American Sikh Congressional Caucus (co-chair)
Congressional Progressive Caucus (vice-chair)
Congressional Asian Pacific American Caucus (chair) 
Congressional Taiwan Caucus
Creative Rights Caucus (co-founder and co-chair)
LGBT Equality Caucus
House Baltic Caucus
Climate Solutions Caucus
Medicare for All Caucus
Congressional Armenian Caucus

Political positions

Abortion
Chu claims that abortion access is "not just health care - it is a fundamental human right." She opposed the overturning of Roe v. Wade.

Personal life
Chu married Mike Eng in 1978. They live in Monterey Park. Eng took Chu's seat on the Monterey Park City Council in 2001, when Chu left the council after being elected to the Assembly, and in 2006, he took Chu's seat on the Assembly when Chu left the Assembly.

Chu's nephew, Lance Corporal Harry Lew, a U.S. Marine, died by suicide while serving in Afghanistan on April 3, 2011, allegedly as a result of hazing from fellow Marines after Lew allegedly repeatedly fell asleep during his watch. Chu described her nephew as a patriotic American and said that those responsible must be brought to justice.

In December 2019, Chu and her brother Dean Chu donated $375,000 to the Chinese American Museum in Los Angeles, California.

Chu is one of three Unitarian Universalists in Congress.

See also

 History of the Chinese Americans in Los Angeles
 List of Asian Americans and Pacific Islands Americans in the United States Congress
 Women in the United States House of Representatives

References

External links

Congresswoman Judy Chu official U.S. House website
Judy Chu for Congress campaign website
 
 

|-

|-

|-

|-

|-

|-

|-

1953 births
21st-century American politicians
21st-century American women politicians
American mayors of Chinese descent
California politicians of Chinese descent
American Unitarian Universalists
American women of Chinese descent in politics
Asian American and Pacific Islander state legislators in California
California city council members
Asian-American city council members
California School of Professional Psychology alumni
Female members of the United States House of Representatives
Living people
Mayors of places in California
Democratic Party members of the California State Assembly
Members of the United States Congress of Chinese descent
Democratic Party members of the United States House of Representatives from California
Asian-American members of the United States House of Representatives
Monterey Park, California
People from Monterey Park, California
People from the San Gabriel Valley
Politicians from Los Angeles
School board members in California
Spouses of California politicians
University of California, Los Angeles alumni
Women city councillors in California
Women state legislators in California
Women mayors of places in California